Ilana Glazer (born April 12, 1987) is an American comedian, director, producer, writer, and actress. She co-created and co-starred, with Abbi Jacobson, in the Comedy Central series Broad City, which is based on the web series of the same name. She was twice nominated for the Critics' Choice Television Award for Best Actress in a Comedy Series for the series. Glazer also starred in the 2017 film Rough Night and released her debut stand-up comedy special, The Planet Is Burning, in January 2020. In 2022, she won the Tony Award for Best Musical for serving as a producer for the Broadway show A Strange Loop.

Early life
Glazer, born in New York City, New York, is the daughter of Sandi and Larry Glazer, who both work in insurance and finance. She grew up in a Reform Jewish family in St. James, New York, on Long Island and is of Ashkenazi Jewish descent. Her brother, Eliot Glazer, is a producer, writer and actor with whom she has worked on shows like The Boys Presents: Diabolical and Broad City where he plays her brother.

Glazer graduated from New York University in 2009, majoring in psychology.

Career

Early work
Glazer began taking classes at the Upright Citizens Brigade Theatre in 2006, and performed around New York City doing improv and stand-up for the next several years.

Broad City

Development 
In 2009, along with co-creator Abbi Jacobson, Glazer began shooting Broad City, a web series starring the two as fictionalized versions of themselves. The series was nominated for an ECNY Award for 'Best Web Series' and was positively received, garnering attention from major media outlets such as Entertainment Weekly, USA Today, and The Wall Street Journal. The series caught the attention of Amy Poehler, who subsequently met with Glazer and Jacobson to help them shop a pilot script based on the series. Poehler also agreed to star in the web series finale.

In 2011, cable network FX, working with Poehler as the producer, purchased a script commitment for the series from Glazer and Jacobson. However, the network did not approve the script and decided not to proceed with development. Glazer and Jacobson then approached Comedy Central, who agreed to purchase the script from FX and order a pilot.

From 2012 to 2014, Glazer co-created the web series Chronic Gamer Girl with Alex Charak.

Reception and renewal 
Broad City made its broadcast television premiere in January 2014 and was received with positive reviews and strong ratings, becoming Comedy Central's highest-rated first season since 2012 among the younger demographics, including adults 18–34, with an average of 1.2 million viewers.

The show has received critical acclaim from fans and critics alike. Review aggregation website Metacritic noted season 1 received "generally favorable reviews", giving it a score of 75 out of 100, based on reviews from 14 critics.

In February 2014, Comedy Central renewed the show for a second season. Season 2 received positive reviews, with Metacritic giving it a score of 89 out of 100, based on reviews from 8 critics, indicating "universal acclaim".

In January 2015, the series was renewed for a third season, which premiered on February 17, 2016. In January 2016, the series was renewed for a fourth and a final fifth season, which premiered on January 24, 2019.

Film
Glazer starred in the 2013 independent feature film How to Follow Strangers. The film won top prize at the Lower East Side Film Festival. She appears in the 2015 film The Night Before. Glazer starred alongside Scarlett Johansson and Kate McKinnon in the 2017 comedy Rough Night. Glazer stars in the horror film False Positive, released on Hulu on June 25, 2021.

Other
Glazer's debut stand-up special The Planet Is Burning premiered on Amazon Prime in January 2020. It was directed by Ryan Cunningham and Glazer served as an executive producer.

In 2022, Glazer was in the main cast of the Apple TV+ mystery comedy series The Afterparty.

Activism

Glazer founded the campaign platform Generator Collective in 2016 with Glennis Meagher. The platform promotes female election candidates and general participation in democracy and political discussion.

Personal life
Glazer was once roommates with comedian Rachel Bloom after college in Brooklyn. In February 2017, Glazer married her longtime boyfriend, computational biologist David Rooklin, in a private ceremony. Glazer is queer and has credited her work on Broad City with helping her understand her sexuality.

On March 17, 2021, Glazer announced on social media and in a magazine photo shoot that she and Rooklin were expecting a child together. Their first child, a daughter, was born in July 2021.

Filmography

Awards and nominations

References

External links

 
 
 
  from circa February 2010 onward

21st-century American actresses
21st-century American comedians
American stand-up comedians
American women comedians
American women television writers
American television actresses
Jewish American actresses
Jewish American female comedians
Upright Citizens Brigade Theater performers
People from St. James, New York
New York University alumni
1987 births
Living people
21st-century American screenwriters
LGBT television directors
American LGBT screenwriters
LGBT Jews
LGBT people from New York (state)
LGBT television producers
American queer actresses
Queer women
American feminists
21st-century American Jews
Tony Award winners
Jewish American television producers
American LGBT comedians